Pleasant Valley may refer to:

Places

Canada

Nova Scotia 
 Pleasant Valley, Antigonish County
 Pleasant Valley, Colchester County
 Pleasant Valley, Halifax Regional Municipality
 Pleasant Valley, Pictou County
 Pleasant Valley, Yarmouth County

Ontario 
 Pleasant Valley, Manitoulin District, Ontario
 Pleasant Valley, Renfrew County, Ontario
 Pleasant Valley, Stormont, Dundas and Glengarry Counties, Ontario

Saskatchewan 
 Rural Municipality of Pleasant Valley No. 288, Saskatchewan

New Zealand 
 Pleasant Valley, New Zealand

United Kingdom 
 Pleasant Valley, a settlement in the community of Amroth, Pembrokeshire, Wales

United States

Alaska 
 Pleasant Valley, Alaska

Arkansas 
 Pleasant Valley, Carroll County, Arkansas     
 Pleasant Valley, Pope County, Arkansas  
 Pleasant Valley (Little Rock), a neighborhood

California 
 Pleasant Valley, California

Colorado 
 Pleasant Valley (Colorado)

Connecticut 
 Pleasant Valley, Connecticut

Illinois
 Pleasant Valley, Illinois

Indiana 
 Pleasant Valley, St. Joseph County, Indiana
 Pleasant Valley, Martin County, Indiana

Iowa
 Pleasant Valley Township, Scott County, Iowa

Kansas 
 Pleasant Valley, Lincoln County, Kansas

Maryland 
 Pleasant Valley (Maryland), a valley in Washington County
 Pleasant Valley, Allegany County, Maryland
 Pleasant Valley, Calvert County, Maryland
 Pleasant Valley, Carroll County, Maryland
 Pleasant Valley, (Cooksville, Maryland)

Michigan 
 Pleasant Valley, Antrim County, Michigan, a former settlement in Echo Township
 Pleasant Valley, Berrien County, Michigan, a settlement and former post office in Pipestone Township
 Pleasant Valley, Livingston County, Michigan, a former settlement and post office in Brighton Township
 Pleasant Valley, Midland County, Michigan, a settlement and former post office in Jasper Township

Minnesota 
 Pleasant Valley, Minnesota

Missouri 
 Pleasant Valley, Missouri

Nebraska 
 Pleasant Valley, Nebraska

Nevada 
 Pleasant Valley, Nevada a small unincorporated community in Washoe County.
 Pleasant Valley, White Pine County, Nevada former populated place

New Jersey 
 Pleasant Valley, Mercer County, New Jersey
 Pleasant Valley, Monmouth County, New Jersey
 Pleasant Valley, Warren County, New Jersey
 Pleasant Valley Crossroads, New Jersey

New York 
 Pleasant Valley (town), New York
 Pleasant Valley (CDP), New York

Oregon 
 Pleasant Valley, Baker County, Oregon, an unincorporated community
 Pleasant Valley, Josephine County, Oregon, an unincorporated community
 Pleasant Valley, Portland, Oregon, a neighborhood
 Pleasant Valley, Tillamook County, Oregon, an unincorporated community

Pennsylvania 
 Pleasant Valley, Berks County, Pennsylvania
 Pleasant Valley, Bucks County, Pennsylvania

Texas 
 Pleasant Valley, Texas
 Pleasant Valley, Potter County, Texas, now part of Amarillo

Virginia 
 Pleasant Valley, Buckingham County, Virginia
 Pleasant Valley, Rockingham County, Virginia

West Virginia 
 Pleasant Valley, Hancock County, West Virginia, an unincorporated community
 Pleasant Valley, Marion County, West Virginia, a city
 Pleasant Valley, Marshall County, West Virginia, an unincorporated community

Wisconsin 
 Pleasant Valley, Eau Claire County, Wisconsin, a town
 Pleasant Valley, Grant County, Wisconsin, a former unincorporated community
 Pleasant Valley, St. Croix County, Wisconsin, a town
 Pleasant Valley, Vernon County, Wisconsin, an unincorporated community

Valleys 
 Pleasant Valley, Arizona, now known as the Tonto Basin site of the Pleasant Valley War
 Pleasant Valley (Nevada-Utah) a valley, located in White Pine County, Nevada and Juab County, Utah
 Pleasant Valley (Fresno County, California) a valley, located on the west side of California

Other uses 
 Pleasant Valley State Prison, in Coalinga, California
 Pleasant Valley War, fought in Navajo and Apache counties, Arizona

See also 
 Pleasant Vale (disambiguation)
 Pleasant Valley High School (disambiguation)
 Pleasant Valley Township (disambiguation)